Cláudio Ribeiro (Porto Alegre, 1958) is a Brazilian conductor.

Career

Cláudio Ribeiro first received a BM in Music in (1982) from the Rio Grande do Sul Federal University.  Following this degree he pursued further development of his conducting and musicianship in Europe, first studying at the Hilversum International Courses for Conductor  (the Netherlands) and then studying with Gennady Rozhdestvensky at the Accademia Chigiana in Siena (Italy). He also holds a Diploma in Opera from the Accademia Lirica di Osimo  (Italy) and a Master Degree  in Music from the University of Denver's Lamont School of Music.

He was a winner in the second National Competition for Young Conductors (1983), (Brazil). He started his international conducting career in 1984 covering both symphonic and opera repertoire. In 1993 he became Music Director of the Orquestra de Câmera de Blumenau (Brazil) which would last until 2000, including a tour to Germany. During this time he also held the position of Music Director for the Orquestra Sinfônica de Porto Alegre (Brazil) (1995–1998),. 
In the United States he was a  Guest Conductor of the University of Denver's  Lamont Symphony Orchestra (2006), Special Guest Conductor  of the Denver Philharmonic, (2006/07) season, Adjunct Conductor of the Denver Young Artists Orchestra (2006) .

About another distinguished orchestras that Cláudio Ribeiro has conducted over the world  are: the Orquestra Sinfônica do Paraná (Brazil) and Orquestra Sinfônica de Minas Gerais (Brazil) (1997, 2000, 2002); Rousse Philharmonic Orchestra(Bulgary) (1988); Deutsche Kammerakademie (Germany) (2007); Orquestra Metropolitana de Lisboa (1997); Orquesta del SODRE (Uruguay) (2003, 2004, 2006); Orquesta Sinfónica Nacional (México D.F.) (1998); Orchestra Filarmonica di Torino (Italy) (1997); Elkart Symphony Orchestra  (USA) and Musica Sacra Chamber Orchestra (2006) (USA).

Current

Since 1984 Cláudio has worked as a lecturer at the Rio Grande do Sul Federal University (Brazil). In 1999 he pioneered a project intended for young musicians named International Music Assemblage, with a goal to achieve worldwide peace through music. He is currently guest conducting, and president of Instituto Musica, a non-governmental Brazilian institution dedicated to promoting music and culture.

Claudio Ribeiro is also a composer, and his works have been published by Goldberg Editions. He also participates in juries of international competitions such as the Guitar Competition of Alessandria (Italy -1998).

Claudio Ribeiro has been featured in several exclusive recitals for broadcast:
Bavarian Broadcast (Germany) (1993)
RAI (Milan) (1988)
Newman Center (Denver) (2007–2008)

Collaborations

Claudio has had the privilege of working with many highly acclaimed artists including:
Raina Kabaiwanska (Italy, 1988)
Katia Ricciarelli (Italy, 1988)
Renato Bruson (Italy, 1988)
Lucio Gallo (Italy, 1988)
Mischa Maisky (Brazil, 1996)
Ingrid Haebler (Brazil, 1996)
Hagai Shaham (Brazil, 1997)
Nelson Freire (Brazil, 1995)
Montserrat Caballe (Brazil, 1998)
Kiri Te Kanawa (Brazil, 2007)
and many others.

Discography
Cláudio's musical directions can be heard on these recordings:
Blumenau Chamber Orchestra – Music of Ástor Piazzolla (1994)
Guest Conductor - Music of Bruno Kiefer (1986)
Porto Alegre Symphony Orchestra - New Music of Rio Grande do Sul (1998)
Guest Artist – Bach 150 Years (1985)
Guest Artist - Music from the 16th and 17th Centuries (1986)

Awards

Medal for Merit – Federal University of Brazil – 1978
City Council Award – Libres (Argentina) – 1992
Outstanding Guest Conductor – Eastern Illinois University - 1997
Outstanding Artist – Porto Alegre Friends Association (2003)

References

External links
Official site

1958 births
Living people
Brazilian conductors (music)
People from Porto Alegre
21st-century conductors (music)